Tingena apertella is a species of moth in the family Oecophoridae. It is endemic to New Zealand and can be found in both the North and South Islands. Adults are on the wing from November to January and the species is common in beech forests at approximately 2000 ft. At rest on the ground this species appears very similar to a yellow beech leaf.

Taxonomy
This species was first described by Francis Walker in 1864 and named Oecophora apanthes using specimens collected by T. R. Oxley in Nelson. In 1915 Meyrick placed this species within the Borkhausenia genus.  George Hudson discussed this species under the name B. apertella in his 1928 publication The butterflies and moths of New Zealand. In 1988 J. S. Dugdale placed this species in the genus Tingena. The female lectotype specimen is held at the Natural History Museum, London.

Description

Walker described this species as follows:

Hudson described this species as follows:

This species is large in comparison to its close relatives and is very vivid yellow in colour.

Distribution
It is endemic to New Zealand. Specimens have been collected in the type locality Nelson, at Mount Ruapehu, in the Wellington region, at Mount Arthur, Castle Hill, Lake Wakatipu, and Invercargill. This species has been listed as present at Cloud Farm, a site of ecological significance in Akaroa.

Behaviour 
The adults of this species are on the wing from November to January.

Habitat 
This species has been said to be common in beech forests at around 2000 ft. Hudson states that the species is very similar in appearance to a yellow beech leaf when resting on the ground with closed wings.

References

Oecophoridae
Moths of New Zealand
Moths described in 1864
Endemic fauna of New Zealand
Taxa named by Francis Walker (entomologist)
Endemic moths of New Zealand